Isopentenyl pyrophosphate isomerase (IPP isomerase), also known as Isopentenyl-diphosphate delta isomerase,  is an isomerase that catalyzes the conversion of the relatively un-reactive isopentenyl pyrophosphate (IPP) to the more-reactive electrophile dimethylallyl pyrophosphate (DMAPP). This isomerization is a key step in the biosynthesis of isoprenoids through the mevalonate pathway and the MEP pathway.

isopentenyl diphosphate  dimethylallyl diphosphate

This enzyme belongs to the family of isomerases, specifically those intramolecular oxidoreductases transposing C=C bonds.  The systematic name of this enzyme class is isopentenyl-diphosphate Delta3-Delta2-isomerase. Other names in common use include isopentenylpyrophosphate Delta-isomerase, methylbutenylpyrophosphate isomerase, and isopentenylpyrophosphate isomerase.

Enzyme mechanism 
IPP isomerase catalyzes the isomerization of IPP to DMAPP by an antarafacial transposition of hydrogen. The empirical evidence suggests that this reaction proceeds by a protonation/deprotonation mechanism, with the addition of a proton to the re-face of the inactivated C3-C4 double bond resulting in a transient carbocation intermediate. The removal of the pro-R proton from C2 forms the C2-C3 double bond of DMAPP.

Enzyme structure 

Crystallographic studies have observed that the active form of IPP isomerase is a monomer with alternating α-helices and β-sheets. The active site of IPP isomerase is deeply buried within the enzyme and consists of a glutamic acid residue and a cysteine residue that interact with opposite sides of the IPP substrate, consistent with the antarafacial stereochemistry of isomerization. The origin of the initial protonation step has not been conclusively established. Recent evidence suggests that the glutamic acid residue is involved in the protonating step despite the observation that its carboxylic acid side-chain is stabilized in its carboxylate form. This discrepancy has been addressed by the discovery of a water molecule in the active site of human IPP isomerase, suggesting a mechanism where the glutamine residue polarizes the double bond of IPP and makes it more susceptible to protonation by water.

IPP isomerase also requires a divalent cation to fold into its active conformation. The enzyme contains several amino acids, including the catalytic glutamate, that are involved in coordinating with Mg2+ or Mn2+. The coordination of the metal cation to the glutamate residue stabilizes the carbiocation intermediate after protonation.

Structural studies

Biological function 
The protonation of an inactivated double bond is rarely seen in nature, highlighting the unique catalytic mechanism of IPP isomerase. The isomerization of IPP to DMAPP is a crucial step in the synthesis of isoprenoids and isoprenoid-derivatives, compounds that play vital roles in the biosynthetic pathways of all living organisms. Because of the importance of the melavonate pathway in isoprenoid biosynthesis, IPP isomerase is found in a variety of different cellular compartments, including plastids and mammalian mitochondria.

Disease relevance 
Mutations in IDI1, the gene that codes for IPP isomerase 1, have been implicated in decreased viability in a number of organisms, including the yeast Saccharomyces cerevisiae, the nematode Caenorhabditis elegans and the plant Arabidopsis thaliana. While there have been no evidence directly implicating IDI1 mutations in human disease, genomic analysis has identified a copy-number gain near two IPP isomerase genes in a substantial proportion of patients with sporadic amyotrophic lateral sclerosis, suggesting that the isomerase may play a role in this disease.

References

External links 
 

EC 5.3.3
Enzymes of known structure